Christoph Eigenmann (born 22 May 1979) is a Swiss cross-country skier who has competed between 1998 and 2013. He won his only World Cup victory on 31 December 2006, when he won the first stage in the inaugural edition of the Tour de Ski, a sprint freestyle. His first World Cup podium was a second place in sprint freestyle in Changchun, China on 15 March 2006.

Eigenmann also competed in three Winter Olympics, earning his best finish of 15th in the team sprint event at Turin in 2006. His best finish at the FIS Nordic World Ski Championships was 12th in the team sprint event at Sapporo in 2007.

Cross-country skiing results
All results are sourced from the International Ski Federation (FIS).

Olympic Games

World Championships

World Cup

Season standings

Individual podiums
1 victory – (1 ) 
2 podiums – (1 , 1 )

References

External links

Official website  

1979 births
Cross-country skiers at the 2002 Winter Olympics
Cross-country skiers at the 2006 Winter Olympics
Cross-country skiers at the 2010 Winter Olympics
Living people
Olympic cross-country skiers of Switzerland
Swiss male cross-country skiers